Each year the Florida Mr. Basketball award is given to the person chosen as the best high school boys basketball player in the U.S. state of Florida.

The winner of the Mr. Basketball Award, sponsored by Florida Dairy Farmers, Inc. and the Florida Athletic Coaches Association, is determined in voting by a statewide panel of high school basketball coaches and prep media representatives.

Award winners

Most winners by college

Most winners by high school

References 

Awards established in 1983
1983 establishments in Florida
Mr. and Miss Basketball awards
Lists of people from Florida
Florida sports-related lists